Harry Redmond (24 March 1933 – 1985) was an English-born former footballer who played as a full back in the Football League in the late-1950s and early 1960s. He was born in Manchester.

He first played in the Football League with Crystal Palace in 1957–58, and made two league appearances for the club. He then played for Millwall in the League between 1958/59 and 1960/61, making 54 appearances for them before moving into non-league football with Dartford.

References

External links
Millwall stats at millwall-history.org.uk

1933 births
1985 deaths
Footballers from Manchester
Association football fullbacks
English Football League players
Crystal Palace F.C. players
Millwall F.C. players
Dartford F.C. players
English footballers